Omnium Gatherum is a six-piece melodic death metal band from Finland, founded in the autumn of 1996. Although the band mainly follows the path of the melodic death metal genre, much of their work shows strong influences from progressive metal, especially their later albums.

History
After releasing four demos, they were signed to Rage of Achilles, The debut full-length album "Spirits And August Light" was released in
April 2003 via Rage Of Achilles and gave the band some
attention within the underground metal community and the press.

Next, the band signed to the major metal label Nuclear
Blast in the autumn of 2004 to release the second album "Years In
Waste". This album was more technical and progressive than their earlier releases.

In spring 2006, long-time singer Antti Filppu was replaced by Jukka
Pelkonen aka J.

"Stuck Here On Snakes Way" was the debut OG album featuring J on
vocals and it was released in April 2007 after a successful UK tour
and a signing to Candlelight Records. The band followed the album
with tours alongside Dark
Tranquillity, Caliban and Entombed, as well as a large amount of
Finnish headlining gigs and attained the No. 31 position in the Finnish national
album chart.

Omnium Gatherum's fourth album "The Redshift" was recorded at Sound Supreme and SouthEastSounds Studios during the spring days of 2008 and it was mixed and mastered at Unisound Studio in Sweden by the renowned metal musician and producer, Dan Swanö, who stated of the album: "I hate bands like Omnium Gatherum, they are so good it pisses me off!!! Their fine blend of melody and aggression is so good I actually thought about stealing the record and releasing it as my own :) You won´t find a better album in years."
Their 2008 album The Redshift had generally positive reviews, inked band to do long European tours with Nile/Grave in 2008 and Swallow The Sun/Insomnium in 2009 and even charting in Finnish official album chart to position No. 24.

In the summer of 2008 bassist Eerik Purdon announced that he will be leaving Omnium Gatherum, and In 2009 Toni Mäki Officially joined Omnium Gatherum as their new bassist.

In August 2010, Omnium Gatherum announced that they had signed a deal with Lifeforce Records for their next release, and that their longtime rhythm guitarist Harri Pikka had left the band. Their official statement read "We're really sorry to announce also that Harri Pikka has silently decided to flee the OG crew after 13 years of solid service. We don't know his exact reasons for this but maybe someday mr. Mystery Man tells us… :) At the moment we've decided to finish the new album as a 5-piece unit, but we have the best possible live guitar unit called Joonas Koto (Malpractice / Ex-To/Die/For / Ex-Hateframe) filling the second guitar live duties at the moment and it rocks!"   Omnium Gatherum entered the studio to record their fifth studio album for an early 2011 release.  Lead guitarist Markus Vanhala handled all guitar parts for the recording. Mixing and mastering were handled by Dan Swano.

Their fifth album, "New World Shadows", was released in Germany, Austria and Switzerland on February 4. 2011, in Finland, Sweden and Hungary on February 9, the rest of Europe on February 7, and North America on March 1. "New World Shadows" topped the Finnish album charts and was on the 5th position on official national album chart and was on the 1st position in Finnish Rumba indie chart!
The album was the band's first to be released via Lifeforce Records. It was recorded during the period August 2010 - October 2010. After the album release, Omnium Gatherum toured Europe with Rotting Christ in April/May 2011.

New World Shadows was critically acclaimed, and is considered to be one of the best melodic death metal albums in Finnish metal. It is renowned for the mixture of harmonizing melodies along with typical death/heavy metal guitars and drumming. The vocal styles vary from deep death growls to clean vocals. The sound of the album is epic and progressive. 

Omnium Gatherum's music is influenced by Gothenburg-style bands such as At The Gates, In Flames, Dissection, Dark Tranquillity, but also Iron Maiden, Death, Anathema and Megadeth among others.

On June 17 it was announced that Joonas "Jope" Koto had joined Omnium Gatherum as their new full-time second guitarist, replacing Harri Pikka.

On July 10, 2015, the band announced that they had almost finished the recordings for a new album. The album, "Grey Heavens", was released in 2016.

In 2021, Omnium Gatherum released their ninth studio album "Origin" and announced a North American tour, supported by Allegaeon and Black Crown Initiate.

Members

Current members
 Markus Vanhala – lead guitar 
 Aapo Koivisto – keyboards, backing vocals 
 Jukka Pelkonen – lead vocals 
 Mikko Kivistö – bass 
 Atte Pesonen	– drums 
 Nick Cordle – rhythm guitar

Former members
 Olli Lappalainen – lead vocals , rhythm guitar 
 Ville Salonen - drums 
 Mikko Nykänen – keyboards 
 Olli Mikkonen – bass 
 Harri Pikka – rhythm guitar 
 Jari Kuusisto – bass 
 Janne Markkanen – bass 
 Jarmo Pikka –  drums 
 Tomi Pekkola – keyboards 
 Antti Filppu – lead vocals 
 Mikko Pennanen – keyboards 
 Jukka Perälä – keyboards 
 Eerik Purdon – bass 
 Toni "Tsygä" Mäki – bass 
 Joonas "Jope" Koto – rhythm guitar, backing and clean vocals 
 Erkki Silvennoinen – bass 
 Tuomo Latvala – drums 
 Pyry Hanski  – bass

Timeline

Discography
Spirits and August Light (2003)
Years in Waste (2004)
Stuck Here on Snakes Way (2007)
The Redshift (2008)
New World Shadows (2011)
Beyond (2013)
Grey Heavens (2016)
The Burning Cold (2018)
Origin (2021)

References

External links

 Official website
 Omnium Gatherum at Myspace

1996 establishments in Finland
Candlelight Records artists
Century Media Records artists
Finnish melodic death metal musical groups
Musical groups established in 1996